American country music singer-songwriter David Lee Murphy has released five studio albums one compilation album and fifteen singles. Eleven of these singles were released between 1994 and 1997 for MCA Records Nashville, with his highest chart entry in this timespan being "Dust on the Bottle", a No. 1 single on Hot Country Songs in 1995. Murphy returned to the charts in 2004 with "Loco", released on Koch/Audium from his fourth studio album and the second No. 1 single of his career "Everything's Gonna Be Alright" from his fifth studio album released on Reviver Records.

Studio albums

Singles

Notes

Other appearances

Music videos

References

Country music discographies
Discographies of American artists